Innes Ritchie (born 24 August 1973) is a retired Scottish semi-professional football central defender who played in the Scottish League for Cowdenbeath, Berwick Rangers, Arbroath, East Fife, Clydebank and Motherwell.

Career statistics

Honours 
Berwick Rangers

Scottish League Third Division second-place promotion: 1999–00

Cowdenbeath

 Scottish League Third Division: 2005–06

Individual

Cowdenbeath Hall of Fame

References

External links 

 

Scottish footballers
Cowdenbeath F.C. players
Scottish Football League players
Motherwell F.C. players
1973 births
Living people
Footballers from Edinburgh
Association football central defenders
Bathgate Thistle F.C. players
East Fife F.C. players
Berwick Rangers F.C. players
Clydebank F.C. (1965) players
Arbroath F.C. players
Scottish expatriates in Australia
Scottish Junior Football Association players